Jennifer Timotin (born 5 November 1999) is an Irish tennis player.

Timotin career high singles ranking is world No. 1,121, which she achieved on 21 May 2018.

On the juniors tour, Timotin has a career high ITF junior combined ranking of 304, achieved on 25 January 2016.

She started studying at Fresno State, in 2018. In 2019 she transferred to Michigan State University.

ITF Circuit finals

Doubles (0–1)

ITF junior finals

Singles (0–4)

Doubles (4–2)

National representation

Fed Cup
Timotin made her Fed Cup debut for Ireland in 2016, while the team was competing in the Europe/Africa Zone Group III, when she was 16 years and 159 days old.

Fed Cup (6–5)

Singles (4–4)

Doubles (2–1)

References

External links
 
 
 

1999 births
Living people
Irish female tennis players
Tennis players from Dublin (city)
Fresno State Bulldogs women's tennis players
Michigan State Spartans women's tennis players